Sverre Haugli may refer to:

 Sverre Ingolf Haugli (1925–1986), Norwegian speed skater
 Sverre Haugli (born 1982), Norwegian speed skater